Charles E. Kite (1829 – March 1, 1897) was a member of the Wisconsin State Assembly.

Biography
Kite was born in Gloucestershire, England in 1829. He later owned a farm in Mayville, Wisconsin. In 1862, Kite married Clarissa Raymond. They had three children. He died on March 1, 1897.

Assembly career
Kite was a member of the Assembly during the 1876 session. He was a Democrat.

References

External links

People from Gloucestershire
English emigrants to the United States
19th-century English people
People from Mayville, Wisconsin
Democratic Party members of the Wisconsin State Assembly
Farmers from Wisconsin
1829 births
1897 deaths
Burials in Wisconsin
19th-century American politicians